KPFN may refer to:

 KPFN-LP, a low-power radio station (105.1 FM) licensed to serve Laytonville, California, United States
 (ICAO code KPFN) Panama City–Bay County International Airport